Andrea Chong (born August 21, 1987) is a Canadian former competitive ice dancer. She competes with partner Guillaume Gfeller, with whom she teamed up in 2007. They placed 4th at the 2009 Canadian Championships.

She previously competed with Spencer Barnes for five years. With him, she is the 2006 Canadian Junior Ice Dancing bronze medalist.

Programs
(with Gfeller)

Competitive highlights
(with Gfeller)

(with Barnes)

References

 National team profile: Chong & Gfeller
 
 

Canadian female ice dancers
Figure skaters from Toronto
1987 births
Living people
Canadian people of Chinese descent